The Brock River is a tributary of the Chibougamau River, flowing in Eeyou Istchee Baie-James, in the administrative region of Nord-du-Québec, in the province of Quebec, in Canada. The course of the river crosses successively (from the upstream) the cantons of Beaulieu, Cherisy, La Rochette, Rageot, Livillier, La Touche and Opémisca.

This road comes from the South where it separates from the route 113 which connects Lebel-sur-Quévillon to Chibougamau and passes to the South of the lake.

The surface of the "Brock River" is usually frozen from early November to mid-May, however, safe ice movement is generally from mid-November to mid-April.

Geography

Toponymy 
This hydronym evokes the memory of Reginald W. Brock, who, at the end of the 1896 geological exploration campaign, was assistant to Dr. Robert Bell of the Geological Survey of Canada, made a rapid geological reconnaissance of the road between the lakes Waswanipi and Mistassini through the rivers Waswanipi, Chibougamau and Barlow River and the Lake Waskonichi. Reginald W. Brock, Director of the Geological Survey of Canada, provided the work maps and survey instruments for the 1910 Chibougamau Geological Survey (Quebec) expedition.

The toponym "Brock River" was formalized on December 5, 1968, at the Commission de toponymie du Québec, i.e. at the creation of this commission

References

See also 

Rivers of Nord-du-Québec
Nottaway River drainage basin
Eeyou Istchee James Bay